Phoenix Patterson (born 1 September 2000) is a professional footballer who plays for English club Fleetwood Town, as a forward.

Born in England, he played for Scotland at youth international level.

Club career
Patterson was born in High Wycombe, Buckinghamshire and attended John Hampden Grammar School. While there he joined the academy at Wycombe Wanderers before moving to London to join the Tottenham Hotspur youth system. Spurs released the player in July 2020. In December 2020 Patterson joined Watford academy.

In 2021 he then moved to Irish club Waterford. With Waterford he won the September 2021 player of the Month award, and the 2021 First Division Player of the Year award. He also played for them in the 2021 play-offs.

It was announced in December 2022 that he would sign for EFL League One club Fleetwood Town in January 2023. On 7 January 2023, Patterson made his first senior appearance in English football, as a substitute in a 2–1 FA Cup victory over Queens Park Rangers.

International career
Patterson made two appearances for the Scotland under-19 team in 2018.

Personal life
He was named after actor River Phoenix.

Career statistics

References

2000 births
Living people
English footballers
Scottish footballers
Wycombe Wanderers F.C. players
Tottenham Hotspur F.C. players
Watford F.C. players
Waterford F.C. players
Fleetwood Town F.C. players
League of Ireland players
Association football forwards
Scotland youth international footballers
English people of Scottish descent
English Football League players